Peter Kuper (born September 22, 1958) is an American alternative comics artist and illustrator, best known for his autobiographical, political, and social observations.

Besides his contributions to the political anthology World War 3 Illustrated, which he co-founded in 1979 with Seth Tobocman, Kuper is currently best known for taking over Spy vs. Spy for Mad magazine. Kuper has produced numerous graphic novels which have been translated into French, German, Spanish, Italian, Portuguese, Swedish, Slovenian and Greek, including award-winning adaptations of Franz Kafka's Give It Up! and the Metamorphosis.

Early life
Peter Kuper was born in Summit, New Jersey, and moved to Cleveland, Ohio when he was six years old, where he graduated from Cleveland Heights High School in 1976. He lived in Israel with his parents in 1969–70.

In 1970 Kuper and his childhood friend Seth Tobocman published their first fanzine, Phanzine, and in 1971 they published G.A.S Lite, the official magazine of the Cleveland Graphic Arts Society. In 1972 Kuper traded R. Crumb some old jazz records for the right to publish some artwork from one of Crumb's sketchbooks in a comic titled Melotoons that lasted for two issues.

He attended Kent State University in 1976–1977, then moved to New York City in 1977, where he studied at Art Students League and the Pratt Institute (along with Seth Tobocman). For a short period he acted as studio assistant for cartoonist Howard Chaykin at Chaykin's shared studio space, Upstart Associates.

Career

Comics

Kuper, Tobocman, and  painter Christof Kohlhofer founded World War 3 Illustrated in 1979.

Kuper has travelled extensively through Latin America, Europe, Africa, the Middle East and Southeast Asia, much of which he documented in his 1992 book, ComicsTrips: A Journal of Travels Through Africa and Southeast Asia.

Spy vs. Spy had passed through various hands after its creator Antonio Prohías retired, but Kuper's version has appeared without interruption since 1997.

Kuper's Eye of the Beholder was the first comic strip to ever regularly appear in the New York Times, and his quasi-autobiography Stop Forgetting To Remember: The Autobiography of Walter Kurtz covers the birth of his daughter, 9/11, and other vicissitudes in his life from 1995 to 2005.

Though permanently based in New York City, Kuper and his wife and daughter resided in the Mexican state of Oaxaca 2006–2008, where he documented an ongoing teachers' strike and other aspects of Mexico in his sketchbook journal Diario de Oaxaca.

Kuper's work in comics and illustration frequently combines techniques from both disciplines, and often takes the form of wordless comic strips. Kuper remarked on this, "I initially put comics on one side and my illustration in another compartment, but over the years I found that it was difficult to compartmentalize like that. The two have merged together so that they're really inseparable."

Kuper has taught comics and illustration courses at the Parsons School of Design, and The School of Visual Arts and Harvard University’s first class dedicated to graphic novels.

In April 2022, Kuper was reported among the more than three dozen comics creators who contributed to Operation USA's benefit anthology book, Comics for Ukraine: Sunflower Seeds, a project spearheaded by IDW Publishing Special Projects Editor Scott Dunbier, whose profits would be donated to relief efforts for Ukrainian refugees resulting from the February 2022 Russian invasion of Ukraine. Kuper contributed political cartoons to the anthology.

Illustration 
As an illustrator, Kuper has produced covers for Time, Newsweek, Businessweek and The Progressive. He has done hundreds of illustrations for newspapers including The New York Times and for magazines such as Rolling Stone, Entertainment Weekly, and The New Yorker. Kuper has been co-art director of the political illustration group INX International Ink Company since 1988.

Awards
Kuper won a journalism award from The Society of Newspaper Designers in 2001. His wordless picture story Sticks and Stones was awarded the 2004 gold medal, and his comic "This Is Not A Comic" won a silver medal in 2009 both from the Society of Illustrators. He won another gold medal in the sequential arts category from the Society of Illustrators in 2010.  His book Sticks and Stones, The System, Diario de Oaxaca, Ruins won the 2016 Eisner Award and adaptations of many of Franz Kafka’s works into comics including The Metamorphosis and Kafkaesque won the 2018 NCS award.

Bibliography 

Comics work includes:
 2019 – Heart of Darkness, graphic adaptation of Joseph Conrad's classic novella (W. W. Norton)
 2018 – Kafkaesque, graphic adaptations of fourteen of Franz Kafka's short stories (W. W. Norton)
 2015 – Ruins, a graphic novel (SelfMadeHero)
 2013 – Tercer ojo, collected Spanish edition of Mind's Eye (Editorial Robot)
 2010 – Alicia en el País de las Maravillas, Illustrated  Spanish edition of Alice in Wonderland (Sexto Piso)
 2009 – Diario De Oaxaca : A Sketchbook Journal of Two Years in Mexico (PM Press/Sexto Piso)
 2007 – Stop Forgetting To Remember: The Autobiography of Walter Kurtz, hardcover (Crown)
 2007 — Le Sketch #04 (Le Sketch) – minicomic with sketches
 2006 – Theo and the Blue Note, children's book (Viking)
 2004 – Sticks and Stones, a novel in pictures  (Three Rivers Press)
 2003 – The Metamorphosis, an adaptation of Franz Kafka's short story (Crown)
 2001 – Speechless, a retrospective collection, hardcover (Top Shelf Productions)
 2000 – Mind's Eye, a collection of syndicated strips, hardcover, (NBM)
 2000 – Topsy Turvy, a collection of political comic strips, trade paperback (Eye Press)
 1997 – The System, (collected as a single book) softbound, (DC/Vertigo)
 1996 – Eye of the Beholder, a collection of syndicated strips, softbound (NBM)
 1995 – World War 3: Confrontational Comics, co-editor of anthology (Four Walls Eight Windows)
 1995 – Give It Up!, graphic adaptations of nine of Franz Kafka's short stories (NBM)
 1995 – Stripped, An Unauthorized Autobiography, softbound (Fantagraphics)
 1993–1994 – Wild Life, comics by the author, comic format, two issues (Fantagraphics)
 1992 – ComicsTrips: A Journal of Travels Through Africa and Southeast Asia, travel-related comics by the author (Tundra and then re-issued by NBM)
 1991–1993 – Bleeding Heart, comics by the author, comic format, five issues (Fantagraphics)
 1991 – The Jungle, comics adaptation of Upton Sinclair's novel (First Comics' Classics Illustrated; reissues in hardcover by NBM in 2004 and again in 2010)
 1989 – World War 3 Illustrated, co-editor of anthology (Fantagraphics)
 1988 – Life and Death, collection of author's comics, magazine format (Fantagraphics)
 1987 – New York City, collection of author's comics, soft-bound (Fantagraphics)
 1984 – The Last Cat Book, illustrating an essay by Robert E.Howard, soft-bound (Dodd Mead)

References

External links

 
 Complete list of Kuper's work for MAD Magazine
 INX
 Le Sketch: mini-comic with Peter Kuper's sketches.

Interviews 
 Mr. Media
 Around Noon radio interview
 Mundo Fantasma

American comics artists
American comics writers
American surrealist artists
Artists from Cleveland
People from New York City
People from Summit, New Jersey
Alternative cartoonists
Jewish American artists
1958 births
Mad (magazine) cartoonists
The New Yorker cartoonists
Living people
Cleveland Heights High School alumni
21st-century American Jews